Lake Waccamaw is a fresh water lake located in Columbus County in North Carolina. It is the largest of the natural Carolina Bay lakes.  Although bay trees (Magnolia virginiana L., Gordonia lasianthus Ellis, and Persea) are present within many Carolina Bays, the term "bay" does not refer to the trees but comes instead from an early science publication by Glenn (1895), who used the word "bay" (which he described as "lake-like expanses") to refer to these features near the town of Darlington, South Carolina. Lake Waccamaw is fed by four creeks: First, Second, Third, and Big creeks. The outlet forms the Waccamaw River which flows south-southwest to empty into the Atlantic Ocean near Georgetown, South Carolina

Geography
The marginal 70% of the lake bottom is composed of clear sand, whereas the central 30% is overlaid with a deposit of fibrous and pulpy peat. The lake is fed mainly by Big Creek and the surrounding swamp lands. The organic matter from the decaying vegetation of the swamps makes the water tea-colored. The lake is full of life. Unlike most of the other Carolina Bay lakes, Lake Waccamaw gets the majority of its water from the surrounding swamp, instead of direct rain water. A limestone bluff along the north shore filters the water and reduces the acidity levels, making the lake ideal for a wide range of aquatic life. Lake Waccamaw has several feeders, called First Little, Second Little and Third Little Creeks and then Big Creek as well as water from the Friar swamp. Underground springs feed the creeks.

Geology
Lake Waccamaw is one of the larger Carolina Bays. Recent work by the U.S. Geological Survey has interpreted the Carolina Bays formed several thousands of years ago when the climate was colder, drier, and windier.  Thermokarst lakes develop by thawing of frozen ground (permafrost) and by subsequent modification by wind and water. Thus, this interpretation suggests that permafrost once extended as far south as the Carolina Bays during the last ice age and (or) previous ice ages.

The lake has been estimated to be between 15,000 and 30,000 years old. It is underlain by strata containing fossils of various ages, including the lower Pliocene Goose Creek Limestone and the lower Pleistocene Waccamaw Formation.  In 2008, a whale fossil was found in the lake. Scientists have removed the bones of a whale that they say may date back 1 - 3 million years. The skull of the whale has been restored and is currently on display at Lake Waccamaw State Park through longstanding loan from the North Carolina Museum of Natural Sciences.

Ecology
Several endemic species are found only in or around the lake, including the Waccamaw darter, silverside and killifish. The lake even contains some species of fish, such as the Waccamaw silverside, that are native only to Lake Waccamaw. The water also contains a diversity of unusual mollusks. Genetic analysis shows that the mussel species reported as endemic are not distinct from populations outside the lake, but many of the freshwater mollusks and fish found in the lake are imperiled, especially with declining water quality. Fifteen species of mussels and clams are reported from the lake. And, of the 11 snail species, the Waccamaw amnicola and siltsnail are also one-of-a-kind species. Alligators are also found at Lake Waccamaw.

The lack of rain in the eastern portion of North Carolina during 2007 affected the water level in Lake Waccamaw. The record low is  recorded in 1993. In 2008, some additional rain and swamp drainage had increased the water levels.

In October 2012, there was a hydrilla outbreak. Efforts to free the lake of the invasive weed were estimated to take between 5 and 7 years.

Human history
Before the arrival of European settlers to the area surrounding Lake Waccamaw, it was inhabited by Native Americans. A place still called Indian Mounds is on the east shore and on the site of one mound, it is said nothing will grow.

Charles II of England originally granted this land to one of the Lord Proprietors who made individual grants to those willing to settle in this part of the new world. These large grants were divided among heirs and new settlers. By the mid-18th century, few of the early settlers or their descendants were left around the lake area. They were replaced by people such as John Powell, who brought cattle from Virginia to settle his grant of land.

There is a quote attributed to John Bartram stating, "This is the pleasantist place that I have ever seen". There is, however, no evidence of this quote in his writings. The origin of the quote is perhaps explained by The News Reporter which states, "N.C. State University researcher John A. McGeachy seems to have found it in his paper “Travel on the Cape Fear River in the Colonial Period". A group of at least 14 men traveled the area with Nathaniel Moore in 1733. The publication from that trip was called “A New Voyage to Georgia.” From old Brunswick they traveled  up the Cape Fear River to Moore's place, then to Lake Waccamaw, described by an unnamed author as “the pleasantest place that ever I saw in my life.”

John Powell's son, Absalom, after the American Revolutionary War, started buying large areas of land. A North Carolina Historical Marker was placed near his grave on August 22, 1933 at Lake Waccamaw. John Powell's son, Isaac, of Lake Waccamaw was appointed first major for Bladen County militia in 1804 and a Justice of the Peace in 1806. He was the largest landowner of his day in Columbus County, owning over 10,000 acres (40 km²) - most of his land in the area of Lake Waccamaw.

The lake was established as a North Carolina State Lake in 1929, and it is managed by the adjacent Lake Waccamaw State Park.

A natural sand bar, which extends along the northwest shore between a fringing cypress swamp and the main lake, was supplemented with spoil dredged to form a neighboring canal in 1946 and developed with private residences. Big Creek delivers tea-colored water from the large cypress and gum tree swamp at the northeast corner of the lake, and the Waccamaw River emerges from the southern shore. A dam at the outlet, built in 1926, now regulates lake levels, which used to fall by as much as a meter during dry spells, occasionally exposing the sand terraces. The dam was renovated in 2008 to help restore control of the lake water levels.

The Lake Waccamaw Depot museum, housed in a 1904 Atlantic Coast Line Railroad depot, is on the National Register of Historic Places. Exhibits include a 300-year-old Indian canoe and marine fossils recovered from the lake, natural history specimens, Waccamaw Siouan Indian artifacts, early European settler artifacts, railroad including a caboose, information on local industries including turpentine, cypress shingles, logging, and tool manufacturing, along with many old photographs. The hours are Wednesday, Thursday and Friday from 10 AM to 3 PM and Sundays from 3 to 5 PM. Admission is free. The museum is handicapped accessible.

Legends of Lake Waccamaw
There are many theories regarding the formation of Lake Waccamaw. One legend told is the story where the meteor (falling star) hit the earth on the southeast side of the lake and destroyed all the beautiful flowers that were placed in the garden by the warriors when they came back from a hunt or from protecting the village. The flower garden was taken care of by the women of the village. Many animals lived in the garden as well. Because the people forgot to give thanks to the Creator and became full of themselves, the Creator sent the meteor as punishment. To this day, the Waccamaw Siouan people remember the stories told.

Another legend is recorded in the book Recollections and Records. In the book the lake's origin is described in terms of a European-American romantic myth. According to local tradition, the large and beautiful lake was once a mound of flowers. The keeper of this beautiful garden was an American Indian princess who was known to all as the most beautiful princess in all the world. Each spring it became the custom for the chiefs of all tribes to send their sons to the camp of the princess. There they were received from her hands a blessing and a wild rose that would bring them good luck. As the tale goes, a young brave who had seen the princess asked her to become his wife. She replied that she had promised never to marry so she could stay in the garden, teach, and send all of the tribes her blessings. The brave became very angry and swore that he would destroy the mound of flowers. His tribe invaded and overcame the Waccamaw braves and their chiefs. The princess knelt and asked to die in the garden. She requested that the mound of flowers be changed into a beautiful lake that man could not destroy. She asked too, that the lake would never become dry and that the waters should always be pure and crystal.

References

External links

Lake Waccamaw informational website
Photos Of Lake Waccamaw
Columbus County Information
Official Lake Photo Site

Bodies of water of Columbus County, North Carolina
Waccamaw
Protected areas established in 1929
Protected areas of Columbus County, North Carolina